Henry Frederick "Harry" Coy (4 February 1900 – 17 July 1962) was an Australian rules footballer who played for Melbourne in the Victorian Football League (VFL) during the 1920s.

Coy, who started his career at Port Melbourne in 1919, was signed up by Melbourne after two Victorian Football Association (VFA) seasons. He became Melbourne's full-back and was an important player in the 1926 premiership team. In the 1926 Grand Final, Coy kept Collingwood's Gordon Coventry to just two goals, despite the forward having kicked 81 goals for the year leading into the game.

References

Holmesby, Russell and Main, Jim (2007). The Encyclopedia of AFL Footballers. 7th ed. Melbourne: Bas Publishing.

External links

1900 births
Melbourne Football Club players
Port Melbourne Football Club players
Australian rules footballers from Melbourne
1962 deaths
People educated at Scotch College, Melbourne
Melbourne Football Club Premiership players
One-time VFL/AFL Premiership players
People from East Melbourne